Saeed Ali Al-Owairan Al-Dossari (born 19 August 1967) is a Saudi Arabian former international footballer who played as an attacking midfielder or forward. He is renowned for his goal in the 1994 World Cup against Belgium, which was considered the sixth-best in FIFA's Goal of the Century rankings.

Career
Owairan spent his entire club career at Al-Shabab, a Saudi club based in Riyadh.

He won 75 caps for the Saudi Arabia national team, scoring 24 goals, including seven in 1994 World Cup qualifying. He achieved international renown at the 1994 World Cup in the United States, in which he scored a stunning individual goal against Belgium at RFK Stadium in Washington, D.C. that was later voted the sixth best in FIFA's Goal of the Century rankings. The goal sent Saudi Arabia through to the second round of the World Cup for the first time. They subsequently lost 3–1 to Sweden in the Round of 16.

Following the World Cup, Owairan returned to Saudi Arabia. The same year he was named as Asian Footballer of the Year. Despite interest from European clubs, he was unable to leave the country due to a national law preventing Saudi footballers from playing abroad. Although he was selected as part of the Saudi Arabia national team at the 1998 World Cup in France, he only made two appearances as Saudi Arabia went out in the group stages.

Personal life
In 1996, he was caught drinking alcohol and socializing with women during Ramadan by the Saudi police. He was given a prison sentence (believed to be around six months) and suspended from competitive football for one year.

The Goal is a seven-episode docudrama biography about Saeed Al-Owairan that aired on Shahid in November 2022 right before the 2022 World Cup in Qatar.

Honours
Al-Shabab
Arab Club Champions Cup:1992,1999
Saudi Premier League :1990–91,1991–92,1992–93
Asian Cup Winners' Cup:2000–01

Saudi Arabia
Arab Nations Cup runner-up:1992
King Fahd Cup runner-up:1992
AFC Asian Cup runner-up:1992

Individual
IFFHS World's Top Goal Scorer: 1993
Best Bombardier Saudi Premier League:1991–92

References

External links
 

1967 births
Living people
Sportspeople from Riyadh
Saudi Arabian footballers
Saudi Arabia international footballers
1992 King Fahd Cup players
1992 AFC Asian Cup players
1994 FIFA World Cup players
1995 King Fahd Cup players
1997 FIFA Confederations Cup players
1998 FIFA World Cup players
Al-Shabab FC (Riyadh) players
Place of birth missing (living people)
Asian Footballer of the Year winners
Association football forwards
Association football midfielders
Saudi Professional League players